The following list shows the Nemzeti Bajnokság I top scorers season by season

References

Handball trophies and awards
Awards established in 1959